Jablocom is a Czech company that produces mobile phones. In 2005 it was settled as mobile spinoff of the Czech electrotechnical holding Jablotron Group. In 2017 the company was sold by Jablotron to private hands (one of its founders) and in spring 2018 it was renamed to NOABE s.r.o. Nevertheless Jablocom brand is still used on all products.

In 2005, Jablocom aroused a great interest in its model "the world's largest mobile phone". Mobile desktop phones (mobile phone in the shape of a desk phone) was originally designed for old people, however, it aroused great interest in regions with poor condition of landline and at mobile operators, who see it as another tool in competition with fixed lines.
Today majority of phones are used in offices and other work places. Phone designs changed accordingly, in 2014 first desktop smartphone with Android was introduced and cloud administration tools for all current Jablocom phones was launched.

Models 
 Essence GDP-09
 Essence GDP-06e
 Essence GDP-06i
 Raven GDP-08
 Essence GDP-06
 JabloPhone GDP-04i 3G 
 JabloPhone GDP-04i RF
 JabloPhone GDP-04Ai
 JabloPhone GDP-04i
 JabloPhone GDP-04A
 JabloPhone GDP-04
 JabloPhone GDP-02

References

External links 
 Noabe (former Jablocom) history

Mobile phone manufacturers
Consumer electronics brands
Mobile phone companies of the Czech Republic
Czech brands